Justin Prabhakaran (born 10 June 1986) is an Indian film score and soundtrack composer. He has scored music mostly for Tamil films and also a few Malayalam and Telugu films besides one Hindi film. He made his debut as a film composer in the 2014 Tamil film Pannaiyarum Padminiyum.

Early life
Prabhakaran was born in Madurai. From childhood, he was interested in music. He was introduced to church music at an early age and groomed to become a keyboard player. He participated in a TV show and won the award for his own composition. He is proficient in playing keyboard and guitar. During a film shoot at the American College, Madurai in 2003–2006, where he studied B.Sc. Zoology, he happened to meet cinematographer Gopi Krishna, who advised him to study sound engineering from M.G.R. Government Film and Television Training Institute, Tharamani, Chennai.

Career
While studying at M.G.R. Film & TV Institute, Prabhakaran came up with his new composition for the Tamil thendral (cultural event) every year.  He joined music composer Harris Jayaraj and worked for him on the movie Thuppakki. He has composed music for more than 55 short films and for the debut movie of Basil Joseph for Kunjiramayanam

Discography
As composer

As playback singer

As lyricist

References

External links
 
 

Tamil musicians
Tamil film score composers
Musicians from Madurai
Living people
1986 births
Malayalam film score composers
21st-century Indian composers
Telugu film score composers